Eudonia alpina is a species of moth in the family Crambidae. It is found in Great Britain, Fennoscandia, Estonia, Russia, Japan and North America, including Alaska, Alberta, Newfoundland, Minnesota, Ohio and West Virginia.

The wingspan is 20–25 mm. Adults are on wing in June and July in Europe.

The larvae probably feed on mosses or lichens.

References

Moths described in 1850
Eudonia
Moths of Japan
Moths of Europe